Tukun Island is an island in Manjung District, Perak, Malaysia. Pulau Tukun Perak is also known as Fairway Rock or Fairway White Rock. This small island can also be reached from Pulau Pinang. There are several boat rental operators who provide fishing trip to Pulau Tukun Perak.

Common fish caught by anglers sought are Giant Trevally, Blue Fin Tuna, Yellow Fin Tuna, Rainbow Runner, Sail Fish, Marlin, Dorado, Coral Trout, Red Snaper, Giant Grouper and others.

See also
 List of islands of Malaysia

References

Islands of Perak
Manjung District